Nohurqışlaq (also, Nourkyshlag and Nourkyshlak) is a village and municipality in the Qabala Rayon of Azerbaijan.  It has a population of 2,780.

References 

Populated places in Qabala District